Bagan Dalam is a state constituency in Penang, Malaysia, that has been represented in the Penang State Legislative Assembly.

The state constituency was first contested in 1974 and is mandated to return a single Assemblyman to the Penang State Legislative Assembly under the first-past-the-post voting system. , the State Assemblyman for Bagan Jermal is Satees Muniandy from Democratic Action Party (DAP), which is part of the state's ruling coalition, Pakatan Harapan (PH).

Definition

Polling districts 
According to the federal gazette issued on 30 March 2018, the Bagan Dalam constituency is divided into 7 polling districts.

Demographics

History 
The Bagan Jermal state constituency was created and first contested during the 1974 State Election. The state constituency was discontinued in 1986 before being reintroduced in 2004.

Election results

See also 
 Constituencies of Penang

References

Penang state constituencies